The 2012 Billboard Latin Music Awards were held on April 26, 2012 at the BankUnited Center at the University of Miami in Coral Gables, Florida.

Awards

Hot Latin Songs

Latin Artist of the Year
Maná
Prince Royce
Romeo Santos
Shakira

Latin Artist of the Year, New
Calibre 50
Il Volo
La Adictiva Banda San José de Mesillas
Violento

Hot Latin Song of the Year
Don Omar and Lucenzo — "Danza Kuduro"
Don Omar — "Taboo"
Pitbull featuring Ne-Yo, Afrojack and Nayer — "Give Me Everything"
Prince Royce — "Corazón Sin Cara"

Hot Latin Song of the Year, Vocal Event
Don Omar and Lucenzo — "Danza Kuduro"
Jennifer Lopez featuring Pitbull — "On the Floor"
Pitbull featuring Ne-Yo, Afrojack and Nayer — "Give Me Everything"
Romeo Santos featuring Usher — "Promise"

Hot Latin Songs Artist of the Year, Male
Don Omar
Enrique Iglesias
Pitbull
Prince Royce

Hot Latin Songs Artist of the Year, Female
Alejandra Guzmán
Jennifer Lopez
Jenni Rivera
Shakira

Hot Latin Songs Artist of the Year, Duo or Group
Julion Alvarez y Su Norteño Banda
La Adictiva Banda San José de Mesillas
Maná
Wisin & Yandel

Airplay Song of the Year
Don Omar — "Taboo"
La Adictiva Banda San José de Mesillas — "Te Amo y Te Amo"
Pitbull featuring Ne-Yo, Afrojack and Nayer — "Give Me Everything"
Prince Royce — "Corazón Sin Cara"

Digital Song of the Year
Don Omar and Lucenzo — "Danza Kuduro"
Pitbull — "Bon, Bon"
Shakira featuring El Cata — "Rabiosa"
Shakira featuring Freshleyground — "Waka Waka (This Time For Africa)"

Hot Latin Songs Airplay Label of the Year
 Sony Music Latin

Hot Latin Songs Airplay Imprint of the Year
 Disa

Crossover Artist of the Year
Katy Perry
LMFAO
Rihanna
Alexandra Stan

Top Latin Albums

Latin Album of the Year
Cristian Castro — Viva el Príncipe
Maná — Drama y Luz
Prince Royce — Prince Royce
Romeo Santos  — Formula, Vol. 1

Top Latin Albums Artist of the Year, Male
Cristian Castro
Gerardo Ortíz
Prince Royce
Romeo Santos

Top Latin Albums Artist of the Year, Female
Natalia Jiménez
Jenni Rivera
Gloria Trevi
Shakira

Top Latin Albums Artist of the Year, Duo or Group
Camila
Los Bukis
Maná
Wisin & Yandel

Digital Album of the Year
Maná — Drama y Luz
Prince Royce — Prince Royce
Romeo Santos  — Formula, Vol. 1
Shakira — Sale el Sol

Latin Albums Label of the Year
Universal Music Latin Entertainment

Latin Albums Imprint of the Year
Sony Music Latin

Latin Pop

Latin Pop Airplay Song of the Year
Don Omar — "Taboo"
Jennifer Lopez featuring Pitbull — "On the Floor"
Maná — "Lluvia al Corazón"
Pitbull featuring Ne-Yo, Afrojack and Nayer — "Give Me Everything"

Latin Pop Airplay Artist of the Year, Solo
Don Omar
Enrique Iglesias
Pitbull
Shakira

Latin Pop Airplay Artist of the Year, Duo or Group
Camila
Maná
Reik
Wisin & Yandel

Latin Pop Airplay Label of the Year
Sony Music Latin

Latin Pop Airplay Imprint of the Year
Sony Music Latin

Latin Pop Album of the Year
Enrique Iglesias — Euphoria
Maná — Drama y Luz 
Ricky Martin — Música + Alma + Sexo
Cristian Castro — Viva el Príncipe

Latin Pop Albums Artist of the Year, Solo
Cristian Castro 
Enrique Iglesias
Ricky Martin
Shakira

Latin Pop Albums Artist of the Year, Duo or Group
Camila
Il Volo
Maná 
Reik

Latin Pop Albums Label of the Year
Universal Music Latin Entertainment

Latin Pop Albums Imprint of the Year
Universal Music Latino

Tropical

Tropical Song of the Year
Prince Royce "Corazón Sin Cara"
Don Omar and Lucenzo — "Danza Kuduro"
Romeo Santos featuring Usher — "Promise"
Romeo Santos - "You"

Tropical Songs Artist of the Year, Solo
 Prince Royce

Tropical Songs Artist of the Year, Duo or Group
 Aventura

Tropical Songs Airplay Label of the Year
Universal Music Latino

Tropical Songs Airplay Imprint of the Year
Sony Music Latin

Tropical Album of the Year
Prince Royce "Prince Royce"(Top Stop/Atlantic)

Tropical Albums Artist of the Year, Solo
Prince Royce (Top Stop/Atlantic)

Tropical Albums Artist of the Year, Duo or Group
Aventura (Premium Latin/Sony Music Latin)

Tropical Albums Label of the Year
Sony Music Latin

Tropical Albums Imprint of the Year
Sony Music Latin

Regional Mexican

Regional Mexican Song of the Year
 Julión Álvarez y Su Norteño Banda "Olvídame" (Fonovisa)
 "La Original Banda El Limón" - "Di que regresarás"
 "Fidel Rueda" - "Me encantaría"
 "La Adictiva" - "Te amo y te amo"

Regional Mexican Songs Artist of the Year, Solo
 Gerardo Ortiz (DEL/Sony Music Latin)

Regional Mexican Songs Artist of the Year, Duo or Group
 Julion Álvarez y Su Norteño Banda (Fonovisa)

Regional Mexican Airplay Label of the Year
 Disa

Regional Mexican Airplay Imprint of the Year
 Disa

Regional Mexican Album of the Year
 Los Bukis "35 ANIVERSARIO" (Fontana/UMLE)

Regional Mexican Albums Artist of the Year, Solo
 Gerardo Ortiz (DEL/Sony Music Latin)

Regional Mexican Albums Artist of the Year, Duo or Group
 Los Bukis (Fontana/UMLE)

Regional Mexican Albums Label of the Year
 Universal Music Latin Entertainment

Regional Mexican Albums Imprint of the Year
 Fonovisa

Latin Rhythm

Latin Rhythm Song of the Year
 Don Omar y Lucenzo - "Danza Kuduro" (Orfanato/Machete/Universal Music Latino) 
 Pitbull — "Bon, Bon"
 Don Omar — "Taboo"
 Wisin & Yandel -"Estoy Enamorado"

Latin Rhythm Songs Artist of the Year, Solo
  Don Omar (Orfanato/Machete/Universal Music Latino)

Latin Rhythm Songs Artist of the Year, Duo or Group
 Wisin & Yandel (WY/Machete/Universal Music Latino)

Latin Rhythm Airplay Label of the Year
 Universal Music Latino

Latin Rhythm Airplay Imprint of the Year
 Machete

Latin Rhythm Album of the Year
 Wisin & Yandel "Los Vaqueros: El Regreso" (WY/Machete/UMLE)

Latin Rhythm Albums Artist of the Year, Solo
 Don Omar (Orfanato/Machete/UMLE)

Latin Rhythm Albums Artist of the Year, Duo or Group
 Wisin & Yandel (WY/Machete/UMLE)

Latin Rhythm Albums Label of the Year
 Universal Music Latin Entertainment

Latin Rhythm Albums Imprint of the Year
 Machete

Social Artist of the Year
 Shakira (Sony Music Latin)

Latin Touring Artist of the Year
 Enrique Iglesias 
 Maná
 Ricky Martin
 Luis Miguel

Songwriter of the Year
 Geoffrey "Prince Royce" Rojas

Publisher of the Year
 Marcha Musical Corporation, BMI

Publishing Corporation of the Year
 Sony/ATV Music

Producer of the Year
 A&X

Billboard Lifetime achievement award
 Intocable

Billboard Latin Music Hall of Fame
 Marc Anthony

References

Billboard Latin Music Awards
Latin Billboard Music Awards
Latin Billboard Music Awards
Latin Billboard Music Awards
Latin Billboard Music Awards